Pipronyssus is a genus of mites in the family Rhinonyssidae. This genus has a single species, Pipronyssus manaci.

References

Rhinonyssidae
Articles created by Qbugbot